Illuminated by the Light is the fourth album by Weird War, said to be their best.

When asked about the album's title, Svenonius has responded "Illuminated By The Light just means lit by the light. It’s like being fed by the food."

Track listing
"Illuminated" − 3:42
"Mental Poisoning" − 4:04
"Girls Like That" − 4:45
"See About Me" − 3:51
"Crystal Healing" − 4:07
"A Visit to the Cave" − 1:17
"Word on the Street" − 3:36
"Earth, Mama, Woman, Girl, Child" − 3:16
"Motorcycle Mongoloid" − 5:36
"Destination: Dogfood" − 4:33
"Put It in Your Pocket" − 6:06

References

2005 albums
Weird War albums
Drag City (record label) albums